Aniela Rodríguez (born 1992) is a Mexican poet and writer. She obtained a bachelor's degree from the Universidad de Chihuahua and a master's degree from the Universidad Iberoamericana. was born in Chihuahua. She is the author of the story collection El problema de los tres cuerpos and of the poetry collection Insurgencia. She won the 2016 Comala National Prize for Short Fiction by Young Writers. In 2021, she was named by Granta magazine as one of the best young writers in the Spanish language.

References

21st-century Mexican poets
Living people
Autonomous University of Chihuahua alumni
Universidad Iberoamericana alumni
1992 births